Craveri's murrelet (Synthliboramphus craveri) is a small seabird which breeds on offshore islands in both the Pacific Ocean and the Gulf of California off the Baja peninsula of Mexico. It also wanders fairly regularly as far as central California  in the US, primarily during post-breeding dispersal.    It is threatened by predators introduced to its breeding colonies, by oil spills, and by tanker traffic. Increasing tourism development and commercial fishing fleets also further threaten the species.   With an estimated population of 6,000-10,000 breeding pairs, its population is listed as vulnerable.

Description and range
The Craveri's murrelet is a small black and white auk with a small head and thin sharp bill. It resembles the closely related Scripps's murrelet, with which it shares the distinction of being the most southerly living of all the auk species.  The Craveri's murrelet has a partial neck collar (Scripps's has none), and dusky underwings (Scripps's has white underwings).  Craveri's black face mask dips a bit further down the face compared to the Scripps's.  Both species can be also separated by voice.

Behaviour
Craveri's murrelet feeds far out at sea on larval fish such as herring,  rockfish, and lanternfish.   Like all auks it is a wing-propelled diver, chasing down prey under the water with powerful wingbeats.  It flies well, and can take off without taxiing.

The Craveri's murrelet nests in small crevices, caves and under dense bushes on arid islands in loose scattered colonies. It returns to the colony only at night, laying two eggs which are incubated for about a month. Like other murrelets of the genus Synthliboramphus (like the ancient murrelet) the chicks are highly precocial, leaving the nest within two days of hatching and running actively towards the sea, where the parents call to them. Once at sea the family swims to offshore waters. Little is known about the time at sea due to difficulties in studying them.

Threats
Craveri's murrelet is considered by some to be one of the more endangered species of auk. It is threatened by offshore oil drilling and tanker traffic. Increased tourist developments and birds getting caught in nets from commercial fishing operations also pose a danger.    It is also threatened by introduced species such as mice, rats and feral cats; this threat has been lessened lately by efforts to restore its habitat by removing introduced predators.

Name
This species was described, named and dedicated to Federico Craveri and Ettore Craveri by the ornithologist Tommaso Salvadori, in acknowledgment of the fact that the Craveri brothers had enriched the Turin Museum of Natural History with many species of birds of Mexico and California.

References

 Gaston, Anthony; Jones, Ian (1998). The Auks, Alcidae. Oxford University Press, 
 "National Geographic"  Field Guide to the Birds of North America 
 Seabirds, an Identification Guide by Peter Harrison, (1983) 
Handbook of the Birds of the World Vol 3,  Josep del Hoyo editor, 
"National Audubon Society" The Sibley Guide to Birds, by David Allen Sibley,

External links

BirdLife Species Factsheet.
Stamps (for Mexico) with RangeMap
Craveri's Murrelet photo gallery VIREO
Photo-Med Res; Article montereyseabirds.com

Auks
Synthliboramphus
Birds of Mexico
Birds described in 1866
Murrelets